Lezhin Comics is a webtoon portal that was founded by South Korean blogger Han Hee-sung in 2013. It is based in South Korea and its services are offered in Korean, Japanese and English.

History
Han Hee-sung, a Korean blogger, launched Lezhin Comics in June 2013. By November 2014, it hosted over 400 webtoons and cartoons, making it South Korea's largest webtoon publisher as of 2014. The content is created by professional and amateur cartoonists including 2013 Korea Content Awards winner Lee Jin-young (Yool Lee) and 2014 Today's Cartoon Award winner Yoo Ayoung.

In April 2015, Lezhin Comics launched its services in Japan. First started as a beta site, an official website was opened in July.

In December 2015, Lezhin Comics expanded its services to include English speaking regions.

In May 2017, it became the largest shareholder in management agency UL Entertainment.

In April 2019, it founded a drama and film production company Lezhin Studio. It will be led by former Warner Bros. Pictures Korea and NEW executive Byun Sung-min.

Controversies

In September 2017, Lezhin faced a scandal regarding their treatment of Gray, the author of Records of the Cold Moon, who announced on Twitter at the end of her contract with Lezhin that she was forced to work on her webtoon despite her reporting that she had cancer. In December 2017, Gray stated in another blog post that she was not paid for the profits her webtoon made in the Chinese server for two years since the first payment in 2015 and that it was the true reason her contract ended with Lezhin. She also stated that she was not told the amount she would be paid by Lezhin, nor informed when the publication for her comic ended in China. Lezhin stated that they did not receive the payment for the sales nor the number of sales due to a change in management in their Chinese division. In response, Gray contacted the Chinese company who stated otherwise. It was also discovered that more than ten other artists were similarly unpaid.

In September 2017, the Korean Webtoon Authors Association posted a statement regarding problems in Lezhin's late penalty fee. The late penalty fee charged the artist up to 9% of their monthly income should they give their manuscript late by more than two days after the due date. In November 2017, Lezhin released a statement announcing that the late penalty will be discontinued by 1 February 2018 to allow a three-month period to negotiate contracts with the artists.

In December 2017, an article reported a blacklist Lezhin had for their artists, which specifically excluded them from advertisements and promotional events. Lezhin responded by denying the existence of the blacklist. In January 2018, SBS reported a leaked email to exclude several works from the main page and any promotional works.

In January 2018, Lezhin announced that their contracts with authors EunSong and Michii will be terminated on February 6. Both authors stated that they were informed not by Lezhin but by their social media accounts. Lezhin later stated that they would take legal action against EunSong and Michii for the spread of false rumors. On February 6, a protest was held in front of the Lezhin office for the legal action and treatment against the authors.

References 

Webtoon publishing companies
Manhwa distributors
South Korean manhwa
Electronic publishing